Joint Entrance Examination – Main (JEE-Main), formerly All India Engineering Entrance Examination (AIEEE), is an Indian standardised computer-based test for admission to various technical undergraduate programs in engineering, architecture, and planning across colleges in India. The exam is conducted by the National Testing Agency for admission to B.Tech, B.Arch, etc. programs in premier technical institutes such as the National Institutes of Technology (NIT) and Indian Institutes of Information Technology (IIIT), which are based on the rank secured in the JEE-Main. It is usually conducted twice every year. Since 2019, the JEE has been conducted fully online as a computerised test.

History 
The AIEEE was introduced in 2002, since the newly established NIT and IIIT universities wanted an entrance examination paper of a higher standard than the Common Engineering Test (CET), which was formerly used for admission to all non-IIT engineering universities, including even RECs and IIITs, owing mostly to the rising competition and the goal of maintaining the exclusiveness of such institutes of national importance. It was renamed to JEE-Main in 2013.

Until 2018, the exam was held both in pen and paper and CBT modes, as well as was held in the first week of April by the Central Board of Secondary Education (CBSE). It is conducted by National Testing Agency in CBT mode only from 2018 onwards.

The 2020 and 2021 exams were postponed and conducted later in the same years, due to the coronavirus pandemic. 2021 was the only year throughout JEE-Main history, when a maximum of 4 attempts were given to students. In general, for the rest of the years, most students took the JEE-Main exam in either 1 or 2 attempts, even though a maximum of 3 attempts is allowed during two consecutive years.

Structure 
The examination consists of only two papers: Paper 1 for B.E./B.Tech courses and Paper 2 for B.Arch and B.Planning courses. A candidate can opt for any or both the papers. Paper 1 is mandatorily a computer based test (called online mode) from 2018 onwards. Until 2018, there was an option between offline pen and paper mode and online computer mode. The examination was conducted only in offline pen and paper mode till 2010. In 2011, as per the orders of the Ministry of Human Resource Development, CBSE conducted Paper 1 in Computer Based Test (CBT) mode for the first one lakh candidates who opted for the same, while the remaining students took the examination in the conventional pen and paper mode.
The number of attempts which a candidate can avail at the examination is limited to three in consecutive years. , the top 2,24,000 rankers of JEE-Main will qualify to take the second and final level of examination: JEE-Advanced.

In 2010, the Ministry of Human Resource Development announced plans to replace JEE with a common entrance test for all government engineering colleges which will be called Indian Science Engineering Eligibility Test (ISEET), by 2013. Accordingly, MHRD proposes to set up National Testing Service, which will be an autonomous and self-sustained agency to conduct this new common entrance test.

The JEE-Main also serves as a preliminary requisite examination for JEE-Advanced.

Languages 
The exam is offered in thirteen languages, namely English, Assamese, Bengali, Gujarati, Hindi, Kannada, Malayalam, Marathi, Odia, Punjabi, Tamil, Telugu, and Urdu.

Mode of Exam 

 B.E./B.Tech (Paper 1): Physics, Chemistry, and Mathematics
 B.Arch (Paper 2): Mathematics, Aptitude, and Drawing
 B.Planning (Paper 3): Mathematics, Aptitude, and Planning

Participating institutes 
Institutes participating in the 2022 centralized seat allocation process included:
 The 31 National Institutes of Technology.
 The 25 Indian Institutes of Information Technology.
 27 other Central Government Funded Institutions including the three Schools of Planning and Architecture.
 State institutes such as the Delhi Technological University, Jabalpur Engineering College, Pondicherry Engineering College, etc.
 Several self-financed institutes (during the spot round).
 Many private Deemed universities use JEE (Main) rank for admissions through their own seat allocation processes.
 Indirectly, the 23 Indian Institutes Of Technology.

Number of applicants by year 
The number of applicants taking the JEE-Main has varied over the years, with a peak of over 1.35 million in 2014.

B.E./B.Tech

B.Arch 
(From 2021)

B.Planning 
(From 2021)

Common Paper (B.Arch/B.Planning) 
(Before 2021)

Counselling 
Earlier, counselling for the JEE-Main was conducted through the CSAB; but, now, the authorities have made changes in the counselling procedure. The JAB (Joint Admission Board), representing IITs, and the CSAB (Central Seat Allocation Board), making agreements on behalf of the NITs (National Institutes of Technology) and other CFTIs (Centrally Funded Technical Institutes), are now united to conduct counselling (common counselling) for the two exams of the IIT-JEE. The memo for the same was signed on May 2, 2015. These two together are known as the Joint Seat Allocation Authority (JoSAA).

2011 incident
In 2011, CBSE postponed the examination by a few hours after the question papers were leaked in Lucknow, Uttar Pradesh the night before. Meanwhile, an alternate set of question papers were sent to those examination centres. CBSE announced the postponement 30 minutes before the scheduled start of the examination.

See also
National Institute of Technology
 All India Council for Technical Education
Joint Entrance Examination – Advanced
National Eligibility cum Entrance Test (Undergraduate)
 List of Public service commissions in India

References

External links 
 

 JEE Main 2022

Standardised tests in India
Engineering entrance examinations in India
Standardized tests for Engineering
Entrance examinations
2002 establishments in India
Examinations in India
Engineering education in India

  JEE Main 2023